Highland Park Neighborhood Historic District is a national historic district located at Lafayette, Tippecanoe County, Indiana.  The district encompasses 240 contributing buildings, 1 contributing site, and 1 contributing structure in a planned residential subdivision of Lafayette.  It developed between about 1892 and 1945 and includes representative examples of Queen Anne, Tudor Revival, and Bungalow / American Craftsman style architecture. Notable contributing resources include the Blistain Axel Merritt House (1914), John Wagner Jr. House (c. 1893), John Ross House (c. 1895), and Bicycle Bridge (1924).

It was listed on the National Register of Historic Places in 1996.

See also
Centennial Neighborhood District
Downtown Lafayette Historic District
Ellsworth Historic District
Jefferson Historic District
Ninth Street Hill Historic District
Park Mary Historic District
Perrin Historic District
St. Mary Historic District
Upper Main Street Historic District

References

Historic districts on the National Register of Historic Places in Indiana
Queen Anne architecture in Indiana
Tudor Revival architecture in Indiana
Neighborhoods in Lafayette, Indiana
Historic districts in Lafayette, Indiana
National Register of Historic Places in Tippecanoe County, Indiana